The 1833 Fractions Lottery was the eight and final lottery of the Georgia Land Lotteries, a lottery system used by the U.S. state of Georgia between the years 1805 and 1833 to redistribute stolen Cherokee and Muscogee land to white settlers. The 1833 fractions lottery was authorized by the Georgia General Assembly by an act of December 24, 1832. The lottery redistributed land from the original Cherokee territory and twenty-two lots that were not placed into prize wheels during previous lotteries. 

The lots varied in size, but the fractional lots left over from the 1832 Land Lottery were smaller than 100 acres and were taken from the 60 land districts and 33 gold districts in Georgia. The fractional lots resulted from irregular boundaries that had prevented measurements of square lots of land. Drawings for the lottery occurred on December 6 and 7 of 1833 for the land lots and on December 9-13 of that year for the gold lots.

See also
Cherokee removal
Georgia Land Lotteries
1805 Land Lottery
1807 Land Lottery
1820 Land Lottery
1821 Land Lottery
1827 Land Lottery
1832 Land Lottery
Gold Lottery of 1832
Georgia resolutions 1827
Indian removal

References

External links
Georgia Land Lottery Records Research Guide, Random Acts of Genealogical Kindness

1833 in Georgia (U.S. state)
Georgia Land Lotteries
Government of Georgia (U.S. state)
History of Georgia (U.S. state)
Lotteries in the United States